Marilyn Ruth Take (born March 11, 1928) is a Canadian former figure skater who competed in ladies singles.  She won the gold medal at the Canadian Figure Skating Championships in 1947 and competed at the 1948 Winter Olympics, finishing in 12th position.

Results

References

1928 births
Living people
Canadian female single skaters
Figure skaters at the 1948 Winter Olympics
Olympic figure skaters of Canada